The 2009 season is the 18th competitive football season in Estonia.

National Leagues

Meistriliiga

Esiliiga

Estonian FA Cup

Flora Tallinn, playing in their 6th final, successfully defended the title, winning the cup for the 4th time overall. The normal and the extra time ended 0–0. The match went to a penalty shootout, where Flora 4–3. Kalju Nõmme played in their first ever cup final, defeating three Meistriliiga sides on the way. The final was played on 12 May at Kadrioru Stadium.

National Teams

A Team

The Estonia national football team played a total number of thirteen matches, and did not qualify for the 2010 FIFA World Cup in South Africa.

U-21

U-19

U-18

U-17

U-16

U-15

References

External links
 Estonian Football Association

 
Seasons in Estonian football